Rolf Ellerbrock (born 30 May 1933) is a German wrestler. He competed in two events at the 1952 Summer Olympics.

References

1933 births
Living people
German male sport wrestlers
Olympic wrestlers of Germany
Wrestlers at the 1952 Summer Olympics
Sportspeople from Dortmund